Curdievale is a locality in south west Victoria, Australia.

Curdievale is nestled on both sides of the Curdies River, its major place of interest is the Boggy Creek Hotel built in 1853, where the locals drop in for a drink and  a meal.

References

External links

Towns in Victoria (Australia)